Manchester Community College (MCC) is a public community college in Manchester, Connecticut. Founded in 1963, it is the third-oldest of the twelve community colleges governed by the Connecticut State Colleges & Universities system (CSCU) and has graduated more than 23,000 students since the first class in 1965.

MCC is the largest of the state's community colleges, serving more than 15,000 students a year, with nearly 6,000 undergraduate students in credit programs, and more than 7,000 credit-free and 2,000 credit extension students each year.  It has an annual budget of more than $31 million.

In 1996, MCC was named an "Honor Institution" by the Harry S. Truman Scholarship Foundation due to its "remarkable history of nurturing and encouraging students' academic and intellectual abilities and motivation."  The college remains the only American community college to have been recognized as such.

MCC is accredited by the New England Commission of Higher Education.

Service area
MCC has the largest service area of the Connecticut community colleges, being the primary community college for the towns of Andover, Bolton, Columbia, Coventry, East Hartford, Ellington, Glastonbury, Hebron, Mansfield, Marlborough, Rockville, South Windsor, Stafford, Storrs, Tolland, Union, Vernon, and Willington, in addition to Manchester.

However, only 56% of the credit student population hails from the primary service area.  There are multiple reasons for this, including the college's reputation in specialized programs such as the culinary arts and criminal justice; cross-registration from students attending other colleges, such as the University of Hartford, University of Saint Joseph in West Hartford and Central Connecticut State University in New Britain; and the fact that the Town of Manchester borders Tolland County, the only county in Connecticut not to have a community college of its own.

Campus
The campus is mostly undeveloped, with large wooded areas and open land spaces.

The main buildings are the Learning Resource Center; the Arts, Sciences and Technologies Center; and the Frederick Lowe Building, which is the oldest building on the campus, having been dedicated in 1986.  There are also six smaller single-classroom buildings located in the center of the college's courtyard, collectively known as "The Village," which house some of the specialized programs, including manufacturing technology and the musical arts.

Special facilities include PC and Macintosh computer labs, a library, a television studio, the SBM Charitable Foundation Auditorium, science and allied health labs, the Hans Weiss Newspace Gallery and fine art studios, and numerous study spaces.  An outdoor bandshell hosts concerts and special events periodically throughout the year, including commencement in May.

For fitness and athletics, MCC has baseball, softball, and soccer fields.  The Town of Manchester walking trails also pass through the campus, connecting it to the East Coast Greenway.  The campus also features a large pond behind the bandshell, which is frequented by the early childhood education program as a sample field trip site.

The East Campus was a group of temporary classroom buildings and faculty offices as well as other facilities that were dedicated in 1971.  These single-story modular buildings were intended to be temporary and were said to have a lifespan of approximately 10 years.  However, they remained in use for 31 years, until the Learning Resource Center and Arts, Sciences and Technologies Center opened in fall 2002.  As of fall 2008, the East Campus buildings have been demolished and the area is undergoing redevelopment.

Academics
MCC offers associate in art and associate in science degrees in more than 40 disciplines. The college also offers programs of a shorter duration in each of the areas listed above, resulting in the awarding of a certificate.  The certificate programs range from 12 to 30 credits, and some may be completed in as little as one year.  The college also hosts various seminars, workshops, exhibitions, and guest speakers each year.

Student support services
The Center for Student Development offers support services for students with disabilities and those needing additional academic help, including counseling, advising, tutoring, transitional programs, and services for international and minority students.  In addition to traditional tutoring, the Writing Center serves as a place where students can receive drop-in assistance with essay development and structure.

The MCC Career Services and Cooperative Education department provides employment guidance and resources for students, including for the internship program.  Specialized services are available for veterans and women, as well as people with disabilities.  Additional offerings include the Child Development Center, Tech-Prep programs, and Excursions in Learning programs for youth and families.

Honors program
Since 1992, MCC has also offered a highly active honors program for students pursuing a more challenging curriculum.  The honors program allows students to conduct specialized research, pursue topics of personal interest, write papers to be submitted for publication, and otherwise engage in activities not typically undertaken by MCC students.  A minimum cumulative grade point average of 3.4/4.0 must be maintained to remain in the program.

Students in the honors program can take special honors courses in fields such as literature, political science, foreign language, mathematics, and the physical sciences.  They receive special notation on their transcripts, in addition to any Latin or semester honors for which they may be eligible.

Continuing education
Through its Continuing Education division, MCC also offers a wide variety of programs throughout the year, including regular credit programs during the summer aimed at working adults.  Credits earned through the Continuing Education can be applied to an MCC degree or certificate.

Credit-free programs are also offered by the division during the spring, summer, fall, and winter periods.  These are courses of general interest to the local population, typically on topics related to personal development, culture, and hobbies such as gardening and photography.  Most credit-free courses meet between four and six times and do not involve the same academic requirements as credit courses.

The Continuing Education division also offers credit-free certificates, including Certified Nurse-Aide, Complete Microsoft Office, Emergency Medical Technician, Oracle Database Administrator, Precision Machining, and Principles and Practices of Real Estate certification.

Transferring
MCC students have successfully transferred to more than 100 public and private universities, both in Connecticut and throughout the country.

MCC has joint programs with both the University of Connecticut and Eastern Connecticut State University that provide students with guaranteed admission to either university and dual academic counseling while pursuing their associate degree.  MCC was the first Connecticut community college to have an articulation agreement with UConn's College of Liberal Arts and Sciences.  All students graduating with a 2.0/4.0 GPA or higher can attend any of the Connecticut State University System institutions.

Campus life
There are students from more than 70 countries attending MCC, with about 50 languages being spoken among them.  In fall 2007, 52% of the student body was 21 years of age or younger.

MCC has hosted a variety of special events and programs in recent years, including performances by artists such as Chris Botti, Katz, and Peterson Toscano; major campaign appearances by Ned Lamont and John Larson; lectures by Scott Ritter, Bernie Siegel, Henry Louis Gates, Jr., and Ralph Nader; and a visiting professorship by E. R. Braithwaite.

Cocurricular activities
MCC has the largest student activities budget within the Connecticut Community Colleges and also receives separate institutional funding for its athletics teams. All registered student organizations operate under the supervision of the Manchester Community College Student Senate, the college's student government association, which provides each active organization with an annual budget of up to $800, not including additional travel and event special funding opportunities.

The college has more than 35 student clubs and organizations, including business and pre-professional clubs, social groups, and cultural organizations. The college's student newspaper, the Live Wire, has received several awards from the Associated Collegiate Press at its national conventions during the paper's history, while the college's student-run Internet radio station, ICE Internet Radio, has been broadcasting since 2007. The college is also home to the Computer Repair and Share Club, offering computer repair to the students and staff at no charge.

The college is also home to the Manchester Community College Alumni Association, the Manchester Community College Foundation, and the Manchester Community College Organization of Active Adults (formerly the Older Adult Association).

Honor societies
MCC has chapters of several honor societies, with the college's chapter of Phi Theta Kappa, the two-year equivalent of the Phi Beta Kappa Society, being the largest and most active. Other notable honor societies with chapters at the college include Alpha Mu Gamma, a national foreign language honor society; Alpha Beta Gamma, a national business honor society; and Epsilon Pi Tau, an international honor society for technology students.  In addition to holding induction ceremonies at least once a year, most of the honor societies at Manchester Community College also hold regular events, fundraisers, and other forms of programming, both on and off campus.

Athletics
The only Connecticut community college with an intercollegiate athletics program, MCC hosts four sports teams – soccer and basketball for women, and soccer and baseball for men. The men's soccer team and women's basketball teams are particularly noted, frequently appearing in the top ten of the national rankings. In addition, the baseball team advanced to the NJCAA World Series in 1994, 2008, and 2009.  All teams, known as the Cougars, competed in Region XXI of Division III of the National Junior College Athletic Association.

In February 2013, it was announced that Manchester Community College would be ending its athletic program due to budget restrictions.

The Fitness Center, open to all students, faculty, and staff, offers aerobics and weight-training facilities.  Specialized courses in areas such as kickboxing, pilates, and fencing are also available.

Community programs
Although most cocurricular events are restricted to enrolled credit students, many other programs are available to the Greater Manchester community as a whole.  The MCC International Film Series showcases one foreign film per month in the SBM Charitable Foundation Auditorium; there is no admission charge. Special lectures offered by campus-based groups and organizations that include the Institute of Local History, part of the History Department, and the Association on Community & Inclusion, a disability rights organization, welcome interested learners from throughout the community to attend.

The Manchester campus is also frequently used by outside organizations for special events, including charity walks, club and civic organization meetings, political events, and press conferences and special information sessions conducted by other state organizations.

Great Path Academy
MCC is home to Great Path Academy, a middle college high school housed at the college that has an enrollment of more than 100 students.  Great Path (or GPA) is a collaborative effort between Manchester Community College, the Connecticut Community-Technical Colleges, and the Capitol Region Education Council.

Students at Great Path complete their high school courses at the college and are also able to take regular MCC courses for credit.  Upon graduation from Great Path, the average GPA student has already earned 30 college credits, which they can then transfer to another institution or apply towards an MCC degree.

Manchester began construction during the 2007-2008 academic year for a new wing for Great Path, which is expected to eventually increase enrollment to about 300 students.  Opened in June 2009, the new Great Path wing, named for the college's president emeritus Jonathan M. Daube, added additional classroom and student space. It also houses a gymnasium that will serve as the home court for the college's women's basketball team.

Notable attendees and alumni
 Carol Lynn Curchoe - Biologist
 Constance Belton Green - Lawyer and faculty member
 Fred Norris - Howard Stern Show

References

External links
 Official website

Education in Manchester, Connecticut
Community colleges in Connecticut
Educational institutions established in 1963
Universities and colleges in Hartford County, Connecticut
1963 establishments in Connecticut